Mutlu Konuk Blasing (1944–2021) was a Turkish-American poetry critic and translator, Professor Emerita of English at Brown University. As well as four books on American poetry, she published ten books of translation and a biography of the Turkish poet Nâzım Hikmet.

Life

Mutlu Konuk was born on June 27, 1944. She married the poet and translator Randy Blasing. In the mid-1970s, the pair started spending summers in Turkey translating the work of Nâzım Hikmet together. She died in her summer home in Turkey on August 16, 2021.

Works
 (tr. with Randy Blasing) Things I didn't know I loved : selected poems of Nazim Hikmet by Nâzım Hikmet. 1975.
 (tr. with Randy Blasing) The epic of Sheik Bedreddin and other poems by Nâzım Hikmet. 1977.
 The art of life : studies in American autobiographical literature. 1977.
 American poetry--the rhetoric of its forms. 1980.
 (tr. with Randy Blasing) Rubáiyát by Nâzım Hikmet. 1985.
 (tr. with Randy Blasing) Selected poetry by Nâzım Hikmet. 1986.
 (tr. with Randy Blasing) Human landscapes from my country : an epic novel in verse by Nâzım Hikmet. 1982.
 (tr. with Randy Blasing) Poems of Nazim Hikmet by Nâzım Hikmet. 1994.
 Politics and form in postmodern poetry : O'Hara, Bishop, Ashbery, and Merrill. 1995.
 Lyric poetry : the pain and the pleasure of words. 2006.
 Nâzım Hikmet : the life and times of Turkey's world poet. 2013.
 (tr.) Life's good, brother : a novel by Nâzım Hikmet. 2013.
 (tr. with Randy Blasing) Letters to Taranta-Babu : a poem by Nâzım Hikmet. 2013.

References

1944 births
2021 deaths
Brown University faculty
Turkish–English translators
Literary scholars
Women literary critics
Turkish literary critics
American literary critics